Louis B. Mendelsohn

is Chairman and Chief Executive Officer of Vantagepoint ai, LLC which he founded in 1979 to develop technical analysis trading software for self-directed traders. His work primarily deals in Artificial Intelligence and Intermarket Analysis to the financial markets.

Career 
He has been interviewed live on national radio and television numerous times, including CNN, Bloomberg Television, and CNBC. He has also authored four books on the financial markets, including: 

 Trend Forecasting with Technical Analysis: Unleashing the Hidden Power of Intermarket Analysis to Beat the Market, released in December 2000; 
 Trend Forecasting with Technical Analysis: Predicting Global Markets with Intermarket Analysis, released in 2008;
 Forex Trading Using Intermarket Analysis: Discovering Hidden Market Relationships That Provide Early Clues For Price Direction, released in March 2006; and 
 Supercharged Trading with Artificial Intelligence, released in 2018.

Patents 
On May 14, 2013 the U.S. Patent and Trademark Office awarded Mendelsohn patent 8442891, entitled "Intermarket analysis". Later that year he was awarded a related patent on October 15, 2013 (patent 8560420) entitled “Calculating predictive technical indicators".

Bibliography 

Trend Forecasting With Intermarket Analysis: Predicting Global Markets With Technical Analysis, Marketplace Books, 2008, 
Forex Trading Using Intermarket Analysis: Discovering Hidden Market Relationships That Provide Early Clues For Price Direction, Marketplace Books, 2006,  
Trend Forecasting with Technical Analysis: Unleashing the Hidden Power of Intermarket Analysis to Beat the Market, Marketplace Books, 2000, 
Virtual Trading, Jess Lederman & Robert A. Klein, editors, Probus Publishing, 1995, Chapter 5, Synergistic Market Analysis: Combining Technical, Fundamental, and Intermarket Analysis Using Artificial Intelligence.
 High Performance Futures Trading – Power Lessons from the Masters, Joel Robbins, editor, Probus Publishing Company, 1990, Chapter 24, Designing and Testing Trading Systems: How to avoid costly mistakes.
 Trade Your Way to Financial Freedom (second edition), Van K. Tharp, McGraw-Hill, 2007, Chapter 5, Intermarket Analysis
 Techno Fundamental Trading, Philip Gotthelf, Probus Publishing, 1995, Chapter 8, Pattern Recognition, Neural Networks and related Science.
 Technical Analysis of the Financial Markets, John J. Murphy, New York Institute of Finance, 1999, Chapter 17, The Link Between Stocks and Futures; Intermarket Analysis.
 Trading Chicago Style – Insights and strategies of today’s top traders, Neal T. Weintraub, McGraw-Hill, 1999, Chapter 13, Louis Mendelsohn: No Market’s an Island, Mendelsohn’s “Method Behind the Madness”.
 The Trader’s & Investor’s Guide to Commodity Trading Systems, Software and Databases, William T. Taylor, Probus Probus Publishing, 1986, Chapter 7, ProfitTaker.
 “Market Wrap with John Bollinger”, Financial News Network, September 5, 1986.
 “Profit Taking with Mendelsohn” Interview, Technical Analysis of Stocks & Commodites magazine, August, 1988.
Supercharged Trading with Artificial Intelligence: The Secret to Success in Today's Financial Markets, 2018.

References

Sources
"Broadening the Scope of Technical Analysis: The Importance of an Intermarket Perspective" Technically Speaking, The Monthly Newsletter of the Market Technicians Association, March 2001
Using Neural Networks to Analyze Intermarket Relationships Journal of Trading, Summer 2006
"Computerized technical analysis: History lessons" by Murray A. Ruggiero Jr. October 1, 2013

American business writers
American computer businesspeople
American financial analysts
American stock traders
Living people
Technical analysts
Year of birth missing (living people)